Misia Remix 1999 is the first remix album by Japanese R&B singer Misia, released June 9, 1999. It was released in cassette and vinyl formats only. Misia Remix 1999 debuted at #36 on the weekly Oricon chart, selling 8,770 copies in its first week.

Cassette track listing

Vinyl track listing

Charts and sales

References

External links 

Misia albums
1999 remix albums